CIBW-FM is a Canadian radio station that broadcasts a country format at 92.9 FM in Drayton Valley, Alberta. The station is branded as Big West Country and is owned by the Jim Pattison Broadcast Group.

The station was given approval by the CRTC on December 8, 1993.

On August 26, 2009, CIBW-FM received CRTC approval to increase their effective radiated power.

References

External links
 Big West Country
 
 

Ibw
Ibw
Ibw
Radio stations established in 1994
1994 establishments in Alberta